Kafeel may refer to:

Kafeel al-kafl: the person who consolidates the guarantee of the first guarantor.
Kafeel, a Bedouin arbitrator, see Bedouin systems of justice
Kafeel Ahmed (died 2007), one of the perpetrators of the 2007 Glasgow International Airport attack

Arabic masculine given names